Luis Curbelo (born 21 June 1972) is a Uruguayan former professional footballer who played as a forward in the top-level football divisions of Uruguay, Finland and Greece.

Career
Curbelo played for Bella Vista in Uruguay in 1995 before transferring in 1996 to play for TPS Turku in the Finnish Veikkausliiga, and he played 23 league games for them that season, as well as appearing in the Finnish Cup final. He made another 22 appearances for them the following season.

In 1999 Curbelo played for Liverpool FC (Montevideo) in the Uruguayan Primera División, making six league appearances for them. In 2000, he played for Deportivo Maldonado, and he scored for them on 17 March 2000 in a Primera Division match against Huracán Buceo.

Curbelo moved to Ionikos F.C. in the Super League Greece in 2000, and he made 22 League appearances for them that season (scoring ten goals). He was also at the club in the following season. In 2004 Curbelo moved from Ionikos back to Uruguay to rejoin Deportivo Maldonado.

References

External links
 
 

1972 births
Living people
Uruguayan footballers
Association football forwards
Uruguayan Primera División players
Veikkausliiga players
Super League Greece players
Turun Palloseura footballers
Liverpool F.C. (Montevideo) players
Deportivo Maldonado players
Ionikos F.C. players
Uruguayan expatriate footballers
Uruguayan expatriate sportspeople in Finland
Expatriate footballers in Finland
Uruguayan expatriate sportspeople in Greece
Expatriate footballers in Greece